Timothy Carroll Batten Sr. (born 1960) is the Chief Judge of the United States District Court for the Northern District of Georgia.

Education and career

Born in Atlanta, Georgia, Batten received a Bachelor of Science degree summa cum laude in industrial management from Georgia Institute of Technology in 1981, and a Juris Doctor from the University of Georgia School of Law in 1984. He practiced with the firm of Schreeder, Wheeler & Flint in Atlanta from 1984 to 2006.

Federal judicial service

On September 28, 2005, Batten was nominated by President George W. Bush to a seat on the United States District Court for the Northern District of Georgia. Batten was confirmed by the United States Senate on March 6, 2006, and received his commission on March 28, 2006.

On November 25, 2020, Judge Batten was assigned Pearson v. Kemp, a lawsuit filed by pro-Trump attorney Sidney Powell alleging fraud in the 2020 presidential election.  The case was dismissed from the bench by Batten on December 7, 2020.

He became the Chief Judge on May 8, 2021, after Thomas W. Thrash Jr. took senior status.

References

Sources

Living people
Judges of the United States District Court for the Northern District of Georgia
United States district court judges appointed by George W. Bush
21st-century American judges
Georgia Tech alumni
People from Atlanta
1960 births